Angela Cutrone (born January 19, 1969) is a Canadian short track speed skater who competed in the 1992 Winter Olympics.

Cutrone was born in Saint-Leonard, Quebec. In 1994, she was qualified as an alternate of the Canadian relay team which won the gold medal in the 3000 metre relay competition, however, and was therefore not awarded a silver medal with the rest of the team at the tournament.

External links
 

1969 births
Living people
Canadian female short track speed skaters
Olympic short track speed skaters of Canada
Olympic gold medalists for Canada
Olympic medalists in short track speed skating
Short track speed skaters at the 1992 Winter Olympics
Medalists at the 1992 Winter Olympics
People from Saint-Leonard, Quebec
Speed skaters from Montreal
20th-century Canadian women